Helvecia is a town (comuna) in the center-east of the , on the San Javier River (which empties promptly into the Paraná River).

It is also located only 15 km from the ruins of the old provincial capital, Cayastá.

The town was founded in 1865 by Dr. Teófilo Romang, who had signed a contract with the provincial government, receiving 50 km2 of land for free on the condition of founding an agricultural colony with 125 immigrant families. Romang first came accompanied by 12 Swiss people in order to inspect the site, on 1865-01-01. Helvecia attained the status of comuna (commune) on 1886-07-14. 

Helvecia is a prime spot for fishing of the amarillo (Banded Pimelodid, Pimelodus clarias clarias), and hosts the National and Provincial Amarillo Fishing Festival in July, which includes fishing contests and folkloric celebrations.

References

 
 
 Bienvenidos a Santa Fe - Touristic website.

Populated places in Santa Fe Province
Paraná River